The 2011–12 Football Conference season was the eighth season in which the Football Conference consisted of three divisions and the thirty-third season overall. The Conference covers the top two levels of Non-League football in England. The Conference Premier is the fifth highest level of the overall pyramid, whilst the Conference North and Conference South exist at the sixth level. The Conference was won by Fleetwood Town who together with York City, the winner of the play-off of the Premier division, were promoted to Football League Two, while the bottom four were relegated to the North or South divisions. The champions of the North and South divisions were promoted to the Premier division, alongside the play-off winners from each division. The bottom three in each of the North and South divisions were relegated to the premier divisions of the Northern Premier League, Isthmian League or Southern League.

For sponsorship reasons, the Conference Premier is referred to as the Blue Square Bet Premier.

Conference Premier

A total of 24 teams contested the division, including 18 sides from the previous season, two relegated from the Football League Two, two promoted from the Conference North and two promoted from the Conference South.

Promotion and relegation
Teams promoted from 2010–11 Conference North
 Alfreton Town
 AFC Telford United

Teams promoted from 2010–11 Conference South
 Braintree Town
 Ebbsfleet United

Teams relegated from 2010–11 League Two
 Stockport County
 Lincoln City

League table

Play-offs

Semi-finals – 1st leg

Semi-finals – 2nd leg

Final

Stadia and locations

* Restricted due to stadium expansion or FA ruling.

Results

Conference North

A total of 22 teams contested the division, including 17 sides who competed in the 2010–11 season, one transferred from the Conference South, two relegated from the Conference Premier and two promoted from the Northern Premier League.

Promotion and relegation
Teams promoted from 2010–11 Northern Premier League Premier Division
 FC Halifax Town
 Colwyn Bay

Teams relegated from 2010–11 Conference Premier
 Altrincham
 Histon

Teams transferred from 2010–11 Conference South
 Bishop's Stortford

League table

Play-offs

Semi-finals – 1st leg

Semi-finals – 2nd leg

Final

Stadia and locations

Results

Conference South

A total of 22 teams contested the division, including 17 previously competing sides, one relegated from the Conference Premier and four promoted from the lower leagues.

Promotion and relegation
Teams promoted from 2010–11 Isthmian League Premier Division
 Sutton United
 Tonbridge Angels

Teams promoted from 2010–11 Southern League Premier Division
 Truro City
 Salisbury City

Teams relegated from 2010–11 Conference Premier
 Eastbourne Borough

League table

Play-offs

Semi-finals – 1st leg

Semi-finals – 2nd leg

Final

Stadia and locations

Results

References

 
National League (English football) seasons
5
Eng